Operation Flood, launched on 13 January 1970, was the world's largest dairy development program and a landmark project of India's National Dairy Development Board (NDDB). It transformed India from a milk-deficient nation into the world's largest milk producer, surpassing the United States of America in 1998 with about 22.29 percent of global output in 2018. Within 30 years, it doubled the milk available per person in India and made dairy farming India's largest self-sustainable rural employment generator. It was launched to help farmers direct their own development and giving them control of the resources they create. All this was achieved not merely by mass production, but by production by the masses; the process has since been termed as the "White Revolution". 

Dr Verghese Kurien, the chairman and founder of Amul, was named the Chairman of NDDB by Prime Minister Lal Bahadur Shastri. Kurien thrust the program towards success and has since been recognized as its architect. If there was one technological breakthrough that revolutionized India's organized dairy industry, it was the making of skim milk powder out of buffalo milk. The man who made this possible was Harichand Megha Dalaya.
The Anand Pattern Experiment at Amul, a dairy co-operative, was the engine behind the success of the program.

Introduction and objective

Operation Flood is the program that led to "White Revolution." It created a national milk grid linking producers throughout India to consumers in over 700 towns and cities and reducing seasonal and regional price variations while ensuring that producers get a major share of the profit by eliminating the middlemen. At the bedrock of Operation Flood stands the village milk producers' co-operatives, which procure milk and provide inputs and services, making modern management and technology available to all the members.

Operation Flood's objectives included:-

 Increase in milk production
 Augmented rural incomes
 Fair prices for consumers 
 Increased income and reduced poverty among participating farmers while ensuring steady supply of milk in return

Program implementation
Operation Flood was implemented in Three phases:

Phase I

Phase I (1970–1980) was financed by the sale of skimmed milk powder and butter oil donated by the European Economic Community (EEC) through the World Food Program (WFP). NDDB planned the program and negotiated the details of EEC assistance. During this phase Operation Flood linked 18 of India's premier milk sheds with consumers in India's major metropolitan cities: Delhi, Mumbai, Kolkata, and Chennai, establishing mother dairies in the four metros. Operation Flood-I was originally meant to be completed in 1975, but it eventually lasted until the end of 1979, at a total cost of Rs.1.16 billion. 
At the start of Operation Flood-I, in 1970, certain aims were kept in view for the implementation of the programs: 
Improving the organized dairy sector in metropolitan cities Mumbai (then Bombay), Kolkata (then Calcutta), Chennai (then Madras), and Delhi through marketing, 
An increase in producers' share in the milk market,
The speeding up of the development of dairy animals in rural areas to increase both production and procurement.

Phase II
Operation Flood Phase II (1981–1985) increased the number of milk sheds from 18 to 136; urban markets also expanded the outlets for milk to 290. By the end of 1985, a self-sustaining system of 43000 village co-operatives with 4,250,000 milk producers was covered. Domestic milk powder production increased from 22,000 tons in the pre-project year to 140,000 tons by 1989, with all of this increase coming from dairies set up under Operation Flood. In this way, EEC gifts and a World Bank loan helped in promoting self-reliance. Direct marketing of milk by producers' co-operatives also increased by several million liters a day.

Phase III

Phase III (1985–1996) enabled dairy co-operatives to expand and strengthen the infrastructure required to procure and market increasing volumes of milk. Veterinary first-aid health care services, feed, and artificial insemination services for co-operative members were extended, along with intensified member education. Operation Flood's Phase III consolidated India's dairy co-operative movement, adding 30,000 new dairy co-operatives to the 43,000 existing co-operatives organized during Phase II. The number of milk sheds peaked at 173 in 1988–89, with the numbers of female members and female Dairy Co-operative Societies increasing significantly. Phase III also increased emphasis on research and development in animal health and nutrition. Innovations such as a vaccine for Theileriosis, bypassing protein feed and urea-molasses mineral blocks, contributed to the enhanced productivity of milk-producing animals.

Features
There were some distinctive features behind the success of Operation Flood:
 Adopting new and modern methods to hold and milk cows
 Changing the composition of animal feed for better adjustment to the condition
 Revision of different producer costs on a sliding scale

See also
 Green Revolution in India
 Amrita Patel

References

External links
Operation Flood on NDDB

History of Gujarat (1947–present)
History of agriculture in India
Dairy farming in India
Indira Gandhi administration